Pedro Araya may refer to:

 Pedro Araya Ortiz, Chilean politician
 Pedro Araya Guerrero, Chilean politician
 Pedro Araya (basketball) (born 1925), Chilean basketball player
 Pedro Araya (footballer) (born 1942), Chilean footballer